Steven Francis Purdy Ramos (born February 5, 1985) is a former professional soccer player.

Born in the United States, he represented El Salvador national team at international level, appearing for them at the CONCACAF Gold Cup in 2011 and 2013.

Club career

College
Steven Purdy was born in Bakersfield, California to an American father and Salvadoran mother. Purdy attended Archbishop Mitty High School in San Jose, California, played college soccer for the University of California, Berkeley, and with the San Francisco Seals in the USL Premier Development League.

Professional
He signed his first professional contract with German side 1860 Munich in 2007, and spent two years as a member of the team's reserve squad, but never played a competitive first team game.

He was signed by FC Dallas on January 14, 2009 Purdy made his Major League Soccer career debut and first start in FC Dallas' season opener on March 21, 2009 against the Chicago Fire in a 3-1 home loss. Purdy was waived by Dallas on September 11, 2009 in a move that freed up the cap space for them to sign Heath Pearce. Dallas re-signed Purdy a few days later.

On April 2, 2010, the Portland Timbers announced  the signing of Purdy for the 2010 season. Purdy was a key player for Portland in his first year at the club. He appeared in 24 league matches and was a key figure in helping the club concede the second fewest goals in the league. On January 26, 2011 Purdy was signed by Portland Timbers to compete in the club's first season in Major League Soccer. He was a part of the team for its first two seasons in the league. At the end of the 2012 season, the Timbers declined to keep him, thus releasing him on December 3, 2012.

After training with the club for several weeks, Purdy signed with Chivas USA on February 14, 2013. In a game against the San Jose Earthquakes, he received several facial fractures after an elbow by Steven Lenhart. This led to Purdy being sidelined for the rest of the season. After the season, he was waived.

International

United States
Purdy represented the United States at various levels,  Under-18, Under-20 and Under-23. In 2004, he helped the United States Under-20s to a third-place finish in the Busan (Korea) Four-Nations International Tournament. During the 2007 season, he was called to his first senior U.S. National Team camp for a match against Switzerland on Oct. 17 and was available for selection but did not appear in the match.

El Salvador
During an interview with a North American blog released on July 19, 2010, Steve expressed his desire to play for the El Salvador national team, and hopes to be part of the team for the 2014 World Cup qualifiers.
Former national team coach Carlos de los Cobos expressed interest in having Purdy — who is of Salvadoran descent — play with the El Salvador national football team.

On March 17, 2011, Purdy was selected by El Salvador in a squad for two friendlies against Jamaica and Cuba. However, El Salvador did not give Portland 15 days notice as required by FIFA and the Timbers chose not to release him.

On May 11, 2011, Purdy received his Salvadoran passport in Los Angeles. Rubén Israel, new head coach of El Salvador, selected Purdy for the 2011 CONCACAF Gold Cup tournament, and he received his first cap when starting for the squad in the quarterfinal match against Panama. Purdy scored his first goal as well as had his first assist for El Salvador in a match against the Cayman Islands at Estadio Cuscatlán on October 11, 2011.

International goals

References

External links

MLS player profile
California Golden Bears profile

1985 births
Living people
American soccer players
United States men's youth international soccer players
United States men's under-20 international soccer players
United States men's under-23 international soccer players
Salvadoran footballers
El Salvador international footballers
Expatriate footballers in Germany
American sportspeople of Salvadoran descent
Citizens of El Salvador through descent
Salvadoran people of American descent
Soccer players from California
California Golden Bears men's soccer players
San Francisco Seals (soccer) players
TSV 1860 Munich II players
FC Dallas players
Portland Timbers (2001–2010) players
Portland Timbers players
Chivas USA players
Orange County SC players
USSF Division 2 Professional League players
Major League Soccer players
USL Championship players
2011 CONCACAF Gold Cup players
2013 CONCACAF Gold Cup players
Sportspeople from Bakersfield, California
LA Galaxy draft picks
Association football defenders
People from Bakersfield, California